Arkady Viktotovich Bakhin is a retired military officer of the Russian Federation with the rank of General of the Army.

Biography
Bakhin was born 8 May 1956 in Kaunas, Lithuanian SSR. He graduated from the Moscow Higher Command School named after the Supreme Soviet of the RSFSR (1973–1977), Frunze Academy (1984–1987), Military Academy of the General Staff of Armed Forces (1995–1997).

He served as a platoon leader, company, battalion chief of staff of the Southern group of troops and the Kiev Military District (1977–1984), commander of the infantry battalion, regiment chief of staff, commander of the school rifle regiment (1987–1992), and commander of the infantry regiment in the 85th Motor Rifle Division, a brigade commander in the Siberian Military District (1992–1995), commander of the 102nd Military Base in Gyumri, Armenia, the commander of the 42nd Motor Rifle Division in the North Caucasus Military District (1997–2000), Chief of Staff of the Group of Russian Troops in Transcaucasia (2000–2002), Deputy Commander of the North Caucasus Military District (2002–2004), commander of the 41st Army (2004–01.2006), Deputy Commander of the Siberian Military District (01.2006–09.07.2007), serving as Makarov's deputy, Chief of Staff of the Siberian military district (09.07.2007–03.12.2008), commander of the Volga-Urals Military District (03.12 .2008–09.07.2010).

On 9 July 2010 by order of the Minister of Defence, Bakhin was named to the position of interim commander of the Western Military District.

He was promoted to Colonel-General in 2010.

He was awarded the Order of Merit for the Fatherland IV degree of Military Merit, Courage, medals.

On 17 November 2015, General Bakhin was dismissed from his post and retired from military service by President Vladimir Putin. No explanation for his removal was given. 

He has since served as a senior director at the state corporation Rosatom, where he oversees the production of all conventional (non-nuclear) weapons.

Honours and awards

Soviet Union
Jubilee Medal "60 Years of the Armed Forces of the USSR"
Jubilee Medal "70 Years of the Armed Forces of the USSR"
Medal "For Impeccable Service" 2nd and 3rd classes

Russian Federation
Order of Courage
Order of Military Merit
Medal "For Military Valour" 1st class (Min Def)
Medal "200 Years of the Ministry of Defence" (Min Def)
Two Medals "For Strengthening Military Cooperation" (Min Def)
Medal "For Strengthening Military Cooperation" (FSB)
Medal "For Strengthening Military Cooperation" (MVD)
Medal "For Distinguished Military Service" 1st class (Min Def)

References

Russian Wikipedia entry, based upon official website of the Ministry of Defence of the Russian Federation, and the newspaper Krasnaya Zvezda.

1956 births
Living people
Military personnel from Kaunas
Generals of the army (Russia)
Soviet Army officers
Frunze Military Academy alumni
Military Academy of the General Staff of the Armed Forces of Russia alumni
Recipients of the Order of Courage
Recipients of the Order of Military Merit (Russia)
Russian individuals subject to European Union sanctions
Deputy Defence Ministers of Russia